Anthrax pluto is a species of fly in the family Bombyliidae.

Distribution
United States.

References

Bombyliidae
Insects described in 1828
Diptera of North America
Taxa named by Christian Rudolph Wilhelm Wiedemann